The talking catfish, Acanthodoras spinosissimus, is a species of thorny catfish found in the Amazon and Essequibo River basins, occurring in Brazil, Colombia, Guyana, and Peru. This species is reported to produce toxic fluids.

References 

Doradidae
Catfish of South America
Freshwater fish of Brazil
Freshwater fish of Colombia
Freshwater fish of Peru
Fish of the Amazon basin
Fish described in 1888
Taxa named by Carl H. Eigenmann
Taxa named by Rosa Smith Eigenmann